In September 2016, the International Union for Conservation of Nature (IUCN) listed 2437 least concern mollusc species. Of all evaluated mollusc species, 34% are listed as least concern. 
The IUCN also lists five mollusc subspecies as least concern.

No subpopulations of molluscs have been evaluated by the IUCN.

This is a complete list of least concern mollusc species and subspecies evaluated by the IUCN.

Gastropods
There are 1944 species and three subspecies of gastropod assessed as least concern.

Stylommatophora
Stylommatophora includes the majority of land snails and slugs. There are 599 species and one subspecies in the order Stylommatophora assessed as least concern.

Charopids

Streptaxids

Lauriids

Vertiginids

Cochlicellids

Trissexodontids

Helicids
Species

Subspecies
Hemicycla glyceia glyceia

Hygromiids

Vitrinids

Chondrinids

Enids

Argnids

Helicodontids

Orculids

Other Stylommatophora species

Littorinimorpha
There are 311 species and one subspecies in the order Littorinimorpha assessed as least concern.

Hydrobiids

Cochliopids

Bithyniids
Species

Subspecies
Gabbiella humerosa humerosa

Moitessieriids

Assimineids

Pomatiopsids

Amnicolids

Stenothyrids

Iravadiids

Other Littorinimorpha species

Sorbeoconcha
There are 132 species and one subspecies in the order Sorbeoconcha assessed as least concern.

Pleurocerids

Melanopsids

Semisulcospirids
Black juga (Juga nigrina)

Thiarids

Pachychilids

Paludomids
Species

Subspecies
Cleopatra bulimoides bulimoides

Potamidids

Architaenioglossa
There are 158 species in the order Architaenioglossa assessed as least concern.

Cyclophorids
Cyathopoma blandfordi

Pupinids
Pupina difficilis

Diplommatinids

Aciculids

Viviparids

Ampullariids

Craspedopomatids

Lower Heterobranchia species

Cycloneritimorpha
There are 40 species in the order Cycloneritimorpha assessed as least concern.

Helicinids

Neritids

Neritiliids
Platynerita rufa

Hygrophila species
There are 188 Hygrophila species assessed as least concern.

Physids

Acroloxids

Planorbids

Lymnaeids

Chilinids

Latiids
Latia neritoides

Neogastropoda

Conids

Eupulmonata

Other gastropod species

Bivalvia
There are 296 species and two subspecies in the class Bivalvia assessed as least concern.

Unionida
There are 193 species and one subspecies in the order Unionoida assessed as least concern.

Etheriids
Bartlettia stefanensis
Etheria elliptica

Unionids

Hyriids

Iridinids
Species

Subspecies
Chambardia wahlbergi hartmanni

Mycetopodids

Cardiida
Boring clam (Tridacna crocea)

Arcida

Venerida
There are 96 species and one subspecies in the order Veneroida assessed as least concern.

Dreissenids

Sphaeriids

Cyrenids
Species

Subspecies
Corbicula fluminalis natalensis

Donacids

Other Venerida species

Mytilida

Cephalopods
There are 197 cephalopod species assessed as least concern.

Octopuses

Sepioloida
There are 45 species in Sepioloida assessed as least concern.

Sepiids

Sepiolids

Sepiadariids
Koch's bottletail squid (Sepiadarium kochi)
Sepioloidea magna

Oegopsina species
There are 126 Oegopsina species assessed as least concern.

Enoploteuthids

Hooked squids

Chiroteuthids

Cranchiids

Gonatids

Ommastrephids

Histioteuthids

Pyroteuthids

Other Oegopsina species

Bathyteuthida
Deepsea squid (Bathyteuthis abyssicola)

Spirulida
Ram's horn squid (Spirula spirula)

See also 
 Lists of IUCN Red List least concern species
 List of near threatened molluscs
 List of vulnerable molluscs
 List of endangered molluscs
 List of critically endangered molluscs
 List of recently extinct molluscs
 List of data deficient molluscs

References 

Molluscs
Least concern molluscs
Least concern molluscs